Shamim Haider Patwary (born 25 September 1981) is a Bangladeshi politician and the incumbent Member of Parliament from Gaibandha-1.

Career
Harun was elected to parliament as a Jatiya Party candidate from Gaibandha-1 in March 2018 by-election following the death of incumbent Member of Parliament, Golam Mostafa Ahmed, of Bangladesh Awami League. He is also a Member of the 11th parliament from Gaibandha-1 representing the Jatiya Party.

References

Living people
1981 births
10th Jatiya Sangsad members
11th Jatiya Sangsad members
Jatiya Party politicians
Notre Dame College, Dhaka alumni